Sokolsky or Sokolski (masculine) or Sokolskaya (feminine) is a Slavic last name. The neuter form is Sokolskoye. 

Notable people with the name include:

Alexey Sokolsky (1908–1969), Ukrainian-Belarusian chess player and chess theoretician
Gennady Sokolsky (1937–2014), Soviet animation film director
George Sokolsky (1893–1962), American journalist
 (1807–1886), Russian doctor
Joseph Sokolsky (1786–1879), Bulgarian priest
Konstantin Sokolsky (1904–1991), Russian singer
Melvin Sokolsky (born 1933), American photographer and film director
Michael Sokolski (1926 – 2012), Polish-born American design engineer
 (1898–1962), Soviet actor and People's Artist of the USSR
Pierre Sokolsky (born 1946), American physicist

Russian-language surnames
Polish-language surnames